Tom Smith (31 August 1953 – present) was a former Scotland international rugby union player, and a former Scotland international basketball player.

Rugby Union career

Amateur career

He played for Gala.

Provincial career

He played for South of Scotland in the Scottish Inter-District Championship.

He played for Whites Trial side against Blues Trial side on 3 January 1981.

International career

He was capped by Scotland 'B' on 7 March 1981 to play against France 'B'.

He made his full senior Scotland debut in 1983 against England, scoring a try in the match. He was to amass 4 caps in total for the senior side.

Basketball career

Amateur career

Smith was a late convert to rugby union, only taking up the game at the age of 26. He started sports playing football as a goalkeeper. Due to his stature his team-mates entered him in the search of Scotland's tallest keeper. He was then spotted by the basketball side Dalkeith Saints and played for them.

International career

He was capped 26 times for the Scotland basketball team.

References

1953 births
Living people
Scotland international rugby union players
Scottish rugby union players
Scotland 'B' international rugby union players
Gala RFC players
South of Scotland District (rugby union) players
Whites Trial players
Scottish men's basketball players
Rugby union players from East Lothian
Rugby union locks